More Gravy is an album by saxophonist Willis Jackson which was recorded in 1963 and released on the Prestige label.

Reception

Allmusic awarded the album 4 stars stating "More Gravy is among the many Jackson albums that is well worth hearing".

Track listing 
All compositions by Willis Jackson except where noted.
 "Pool Shark" – 3:59  
 "Somewhere Along the Way" (Kurt Adams, Sammy Gallop) – 4:19  
 "Stuffin'" – 7:13  
 "Nuther'n Like Thuther'n" (Joe Hadrick, Willis Jackson) – 7:37  
 "More Gravy" – 4:09  
 "Fiddlin'" – 5:13

Personnel 
Willis Jackson – tenor saxophone
Frank Robinson – trumpet
Carl Wilson – organ
Pat Martino – guitar
Sam Jones – bass
Joe Hadrick  – drums

References 

Willis Jackson (saxophonist) albums
1964 albums
Prestige Records albums
Albums recorded at Van Gelder Studio
Albums produced by Ozzie Cadena